Douglas B. Maddox (born January 1, 1966 in Manassas, Virginia, USA) is an American film producer, executive producer, and production manager. Douglas Maddox was inducted into the Producers Guild of America in July 2007 and has since served as the National Capital Chair. Now he holds the position of Chair Emeritus.  He is best known for producing the film, The Bill Collector, starring Danny Trejo and Undaunted, an award-winning biopic on the early life of author and speaker Josh McDowell.

Producers Guild of America 

Douglas Maddox was inducted into the Producers Guild of America in July 2007 and has since served as the National Capital Chair and as a member of the Broadband Committee.  Douglas was honored with the Marc A. Levy distinguished service award in 2011. He started the National Capital Chapter of the Producers Guild where he holds the position of Chair Emeritus of that chapter.

Filmography 

The Pizza King (2008)  – Executive Producer, Producer
The Bill Collector (2010) –  Executive Producer, Producer
Undaunted... The Early Life of Josh McDowell (2012) – Executive Producer, Producer

Documentaries 

Discoveries of Israel (2009) – Producer, Director
City of David (2010) – Producer, Director

References

External links 

 DBM Communications: Douglas Maddox

Moonlit Pictures
 Visual Story Network

American film producers
1966 births
Living people
Towson University alumni